Miss Edgar's and Miss Cramp's School (ECS) is an independent school for girls that is located in Westmount, Quebec. It is situated near other  schools, including Selwyn House School and The Study. The school teaches students from Kindergarten up to Grade 11.

The annual tuition fees for attending the school range from $19,050 to $22,160. The school also receives subsidies from the provincial government for middle and senior school, which means all students in those sections must have a certificate of eligibility allowing them to attend government-funded English schools in Quebec in accordance with Bill 101. Students without the certificate can attend the non-subsidized junior school section and qualify for the certificate after three years as long as they and any of their siblings have never previously attended a French school.

History
Miss Edgar's and Miss Cramp's School was founded in 1909 by Maud Edgar and Mary Cramp. Maud Edgar, who served as the headmistress, was the daughter of the historian and feminist Matilda Ridout Edgar and the lawyer and politician James David Edgar.
The school has always been an all-girls school and began its life in a home on Guy Street in Downtown Montreal. There were 70 girls at the outset, including 15 boarders. The school's initial goals were to equip their pupils with a broad understanding of literature, languages, ethics, fine arts, as well as science and mathematics. The most novel feature of the curriculum was the organization of literature and history.

Forty years later, the school relocated to a building on Cedar Avenue, on the slope of Mount Royal. By then there were approximately 150 girls attending, which included 17 boarders. The school continued to grow in size for another 16 years, and after observing a larger property at the corner of Mount Pleasant and Montrose Avenue in 1964, the school undertook a major fundraising campaign to make the move possible. The official opening took place in November 1964. At that point, ECS became a dedicated day school.

Today, the school is located at 525 Mount Pleasant Avenue, the property bought in 1964. The school anthem was written by Isabelle Adami.

School organization
ECS is divided into three "schools": junior school (K-grade 5), middle school (grade 6-grade 8) and senior school (grade 9 - grade 11).

Today the school has approximately three hundred students in total from kindergarten to grade 11. There are about 20 students in each grade. Grade 4 and up  is divided into two classes. In total, the students are divided into three house groups. The houses and their colours are: Cramp house, which is represented by the colour red; Edgar house which is represented by the colour green; and Adami house, which is represented by the colour blue. Each house has three elected officials from Grade 11.

Music
ECS has both vocal and instrumental extra-curricular activities. Open to middle and senior school students are: Vocal Jazz, Senior Choir, Junior Jazz Band, Senior Jazz Band and Symphonic Ensemble. For the junior students there is a junior choir and an annual junior school musical in addition to their regular music classes.

Every year, both the vocal and instrumental groups each go on a music trip. Previous destinations include Costa Rica, Mexico, Boston, Prague, Orlando, Washington, Philadelphia and New York City.

ECS' Vocal Jazz has been generating musical sound with Selwyn House School's Jazz Band for years now, and won several medals this year in Orlando, Florida, during Spring Break. The ECS girls and Selwyn boys competed against schools much larger than their own.

Athletics
ECS actively participates in friendly competition for sports. They have a soccer, rugby, basketball, swimming, badminton, curling, golf, tennis, football, track and field, halo, cross country, squash, ski, hockey team and others. ECS is an elite athletic school.

Notable alumni
 Gretta Chambers, journalist and former Chancellor of McGill University
 Carole Corbeil, art critic and author
 Bianca Farella, rugby player
 Jessica Mulroney, fashion stylist
 Myfanwy Pavelic, portrait artist
 Barbara Pentland, composer
 Lilias Torrance Newton, painter

References

External links

English-language schools in Quebec
Schools in Westmount, Quebec
Elementary schools in Montreal
High schools in Montreal
Private schools in Quebec
Girls' schools in Canada